Edward E. Kidder (1846 or 1847 - 1927) was a playwright in the United States. Several of his works were adapted to film including A Poor Relation in 1921.

He was married to Augusta Raymond Kidder (died 1939). The New York Public Library has a collection of his scripts. He wrote about two dozen Broadway shows and toured.

He was born in Charleston, Massachusetts.

Samuel French advertised plays by various playwrights including Kidder.

Works
Three of a Kind
Sky Farm
Jolly American Tramp
Shannon of the 6th
Peaceful Valley
A College Cinderella
All By His Lonesome
The Bridge Party

Stage Struck
The Bungalow Bride
A Run For Her Money
A Lively Legacy
The Moon Child
Easy Dawson
The Devil's Diamond
A Poor Relation
An Ocean Pearl

Filmography
Shannon of the Sixth (1914)
Peaceful Valley (1920)
A Poor Relation (1921)

See also
Carroll Johnson
Lillian Lee

References

American dramatists and playwrights
1840s births
1927 deaths
Year of birth uncertain